Abū ‘Awn Idrīs ibn Ḥasan ibn Abī Numayy was Emir of Mecca and ruler of the Hejaz from 1603 to 1624.

Biography
Idris was born in Dhu al-Qi'dah 974 AH (May/June 1567), during the joint reign of his father Sharif Hasan and his grandfather Sharif Muhammad Abu Numayy II. His mother was Hana—or Haya—bint Ahmad ibn Humaydah. His kunyah was Abu Awn.

Reign
After his father's death in Jumada II 1010 AH (November 1601) Idris traveled to Istanbul and resided there for some time. He returned to the Hejaz during the reign of his brother, Sharif Abu Talib ibn Hasan. In Jumada II 1012 AH (November 1603) Abu Talib died, and the ashraf elected Idris as Emir with his brother Fuhayd ibn Hasan and his nephew Muhsin ibn Husayn as co-rulers. Both were included in the du'a alongside Idris, and were together allotted one quarter of the Emirate's income. Sultan Ahmed I ratified the decision and sent the customary khil'ah (robe of honor) and diploma from Istanbul. The royal proclamation was read out in the Masjid al-Haram on Wednesday, 11 Safar 1013 AH (7 July 1604).

In late Rabi II 1019 AH (July 1610), Idris and Muhsin deposed Fuhayd and exiled him from Mecca.

Deposition
In 1033 AH (1624) a dispute occurred between Idris and Muhsin. In the end, Muhsin convened the ahl al-hall wal-aqd from the ashraf, scholars, jurists, and notables of Mecca, and they decided to remove Idris from office. On Thursday, 4 Muharram 1034 AH (16 October 1624) fighting broke out as Muhsin was proclaimed sole Emir of Mecca. That night a ceasefire was enacted that allowed Idris to stay in Mecca for a few months. On Friday the khutbah was made in the name of Sharif Muhsin alone.

Exile and death
Idris fell ill in Safar 1034 (November/December 1624) and left Mecca in poor health on the night of 12 Rabi I. He died in the Jabal Shammar region on 14 Jumada II or 17 Jumada II, according to different sources, and was buried at Yatab. News of his death reached Mecca in early Rajab (April), and salat al-gha'ib (the funeral prayer in absentia) was offered for him in the Masjid al-Haram.

References

Sources
 
 

 
 
 

1567 births
1625 deaths
Banu Qatadah
16th-century Arabs
17th-century Arabs